Geert Hendrik Hammink (born 12 July 1969) is a Dutch former basketball player and current coach. He is the current head coach of the Skyliners Frankfurt of the German Basketball Bundesliga. He was selected by the Orlando Magic in the first round (26th overall) of the 1993 NBA Draft. Hammink played for the Magic and had a small stint with the Golden State Warriors in 3 NBA seasons. In his NBA career, Hammink appeared in 8 games and scored a total of 14 points. He played college basketball at Louisiana State University (LSU).

He had a small role as a member of the Indiana Hoosiers basketball team in the movie Blue Chips.

Coaching career

Dutch Windmills
On 6 July 2018, Hammink was appointed as head coach of the Dutch Windmills, which made its debut season in the Dutch Basketball League (DBL). Despite reaching the semi-finals of the NBB Cup and being in the fifth place in the DBL, Windmills struggled with financial problems throughout the season. In December 2018, Windmills was refused entrance to its home arena due to its payment arrears. On 10 April 2019, it was announced that Windmills would withdraw from the DBL. Its results in the second half of the competition were scrapped by the DBL.

ZZ Leiden
On 17 May 2020, Hammink signed a contract as head coach of ZZ Leiden until 2021. Leiden finished in the first-placed with a 17–4 record and Hammink was named the DBL Coach of the Year after the regular season. In 2022, he guided Leiden to the championship title in the BNXT League.

Skyliners Frankfurt 
Hammink agreed with Leiden to leave his contract early and inked a two-year deal with German Bundesliga outfit Skyliners Frankfurt in June 2022.

Honours

Playing career

Club
Alba Berlin
3× Basketball Bundesliga: (1998, 1999, 2000)
2× German Cup: (1999, 2004)
AEK Athens
Greek Cup: (2001)

Individual
BBL All-Star: (2004)

Coaching career

Club
ZZ Leiden
Dutch Basketball League: (2021)
Dutch Supercup: (2021)

Individual
DBL Coach of the Year: (2021)
BNXT League Dutch Coach of the Year: (2022)

Personal
Hammink's Baton Rouge, Louisiana-born sons, Shane Hammink, and twins Ryan Hammink and Nick Hammink, are also professional basketball players. Shane Hammink played for Canarias Basketball Academy in Spain's Canary Islands, was a member of the LSU Tigers basketball team and Valparaiso Crusaders men's basketball team. He was considered one of the top players in Europe prior to college.

References

External links
Brief biography at BasketballReference.com
Basket-Stats.info page

1969 births
Living people
AEK B.C. players
Alba Berlin players
Aris B.C. players
Centers (basketball)
Dutch expatriate basketball people in Germany
Dutch expatriate basketball people in Greece
Dutch expatriate basketball people in Italy
Dutch expatriate basketball people in the United States
Sportspeople from Gelderland
Dutch men's basketball players
Dutch Windmill coaches
Golden State Warriors players
Greek Basket League players
Köln 99ers players
LSU Tigers basketball players
National Basketball Association players from the Netherlands
Omaha Racers players
Orlando Magic draft picks
Orlando Magic players
Pallacanestro Cantù players
Panionios B.C. players
People from Montferland
Skyliners Frankfurt coaches
Zorg en Zekerheid Leiden coaches